Lisa Dian Owen Wyckoff (born 8 July 1965), known professionally as Lisa Owen, is a Mexican actress and writer. She is best known for her role as Doña Alba in the hit Telemundo telenovela El Señor de los Cielos.

Filmography

Films

Television

Awards and nominations

References

External links 

Mexican telenovela actresses
Living people
Mexican film actresses
Actresses from Mexico City
20th-century Mexican actresses
21st-century Mexican actresses
1965 births